The Feistritz Saddle (elevation 1,298 m) is a high mountain pass in the Austrian Alps between the Bundesländer of Lower Austria and Styria.

The pass leads between the Wechsel (1,743 m) and the Stuhleck (1,784 m).

With the Semmering, it is one of the most important links between Lower Austria and Styria.

Many hiking trails in the area make it a destination for hikers, particularly to the nearby Sonnwendstein. In winter, the area is a popular cross-country skiing venue.

Mountain passes of the Alps
Mountain passes of Lower Austria
Mountain passes of Styria
Fischbach Alps